Alkimos is a coastal suburb of Perth, Western Australia, located  north-northwest of Perth's central business district. It is part of the City of Wanneroo local government area.

For the most part, the suburb is covered in native banksia woodland, scrubland and heath typical of the Swan Coastal Plain. The area is part of the Alkimos-Eglinton region being considered by the State Government for a future city centre and urban region. On 5 November 2008, the WA State Government announced it was actively seeking a development partner for the project.

Geography
Alkimos lies roughly between the proposed Mitchell Freeway to the east and the Indian Ocean to the west. The locality is bounded to the north by Eglinton, to the east by Carabooda and to the south by the newly developed suburbs of Butler and Jindalee.

History
Alkimos is named after the shipwreck of the Greek freighter Alkimos that ran aground on the coast nearby in 1963. The wreck lies approximately 410 metres off shore.

There are future plans for an Alkimos-Eglinton satellite city, covered by Amendment 1029/33 to the Metropolitan Region Scheme (May 2006). LandCorp estimated that 55,000 people would live in the area once it is complete, that the centre will include "hospitals, tertiary educational institutions, major retail, commercial and recreational facilities" and that stage 1 blocks would be offered for sale in 2008. The Environmental Protection Authority, however, raised concerns in November 2005 about the amendment, saying that it "would, in part, be inconsistent with the conservation and protection of significant environmental and geoheritage values in the area", and recommended that the amount of reserves be greatly increased.
When the town is developed, a proposed extension of the Joondalup railway line will see three stations in the area.

Demographics
Alkimos has a population of 6,269 according to the ABS 2016 census. The suburb was not enumerated in the 2011 census.

Amenities and facilities
Amongst others there is an IGA supermarket in Alkimos Beach and a Coles supermarket in Alkimos Trinity estate. Eglinton Rocks and the Alkimos wreck can be viewed from the coastline, where almost untouched beaches are accessible by sandtrack which can be reached from the Marmion Avenue stretch. The suburb offers a wide array of native scrubland, woodland and heath, varying in condition from excellent to completely degraded, and including Xanthorrhoea preissii (traditionally known as "balga"), banksia, sheoak and Nuytsia floribunda. Some degradation has occurred due to uncontrolled vehicular access, clearing for stock grazing, fire and rabbits.

Education

The 2 public primary schools in Alkimos are Alkimos Primary School and Alkimos Beach Primary School. The public high school in Alkimos is Alkimos College, which opened to Year 7 students in 2020, and will grow to Year 12 students by 2025. Year 8 to 12 students can go to the nearby Butler College. It is expected that another public high school will be needed in Alkimos by 2024. St James Anglican School is an K–11 Anglican school in Alkimos, which will expand to Year 12 students in 2021.

Transport
In 2008, Marmion Avenue was extended through the suburb, which had previously been unserviced by the road network. On 14 December 2008, the 490 Transperth service between Clarkson train station and Two Rocks was rerouted from Wanneroo Road to Marmion Avenue through the middle of Alkimos, operated by Swan Transit.
As part of the satellite city proposals, the Joondalup Line will be extended through the area with a planned 3 stations, with possible names Alkimos, North Alkimos, & Eglinton.

References

External links
 Metropolitan Region Scheme Amendment 1029/33 Alkimos-Eglinton - Download (6MB)

Suburbs of Perth, Western Australia
Suburbs of the City of Wanneroo